Aba Bayefsky  (April 7, 1923 – May 5, 2001) was an artist and teacher.

Career
Bayefsky was born to a Jewish family in Toronto, Ontario, the second son of a Russian-born father and a Scottish-born mother. He studied at the Central Technical School. During his teens, he attended classes at the Children's Art Centre of the Art Gallery of Ontario, where he was encouraged by such artists as Arthur Lismer, Erma Sutcliffe, Dorothy Medhurst, and A. Y. Jackson. He later studied at the Académie Julian in Paris.

Bayefsky enlisted in the RCAF in October, 1942, and was made a Flight Lieutenant. He was appointed an official war artist in December, 1944, assigned to depict airborne operations over north-west Europe. He entered the Bergen-Belsen concentration camp shortly after its liberation and recorded what he saw in sketchbooks (these were destroyed in a fire later).

After the war, he was an instructor at the Ontario College of Art. In 1958, he was made a member of the Royal Canadian Academy of Arts and in 1979, he was made a member of the Order of Canada. Throughout the late 1970s and early 1980s, Bayefsky maintained an interest in tattooing and produced a series of portraits of tattooed people from Toronto and Japan.

References

External links
 Aba Bayefsky at The Canadian Encyclopedia
 Profile from Archives Ontario

1923 births
2001 deaths
Canadian academics of fine arts
Canadian people of Russian descent
Canadian people of Scottish descent
Jewish Canadian artists
20th-century Canadian painters
Canadian male painters
Members of the Order of Canada
Members of the Royal Canadian Academy of Arts
Artists from Toronto
Royal Canadian Air Force officers
Canadian war artists
Royal Canadian Air Force personnel of World War II
20th-century Canadian male artists